Moin, moi or mojn is a Low German, Frisian, High German ( or ), Danish and Kashubian greeting from East Frisia, Northern Germany, the eastern and northern Netherlands, Southern Jutland in Denmark and parts of Kashubia. 

It means "hello" and, in some places, "goodbye" as well.

Usage

Moin is used at all times of day, not just in the morning (see Etymology section below). The reduplicated form moin moin is often heard, although some authors claim it is regarded by locals as tourists' usage.

Etymology

However, the word may actually also derive from the Dutch, Frisian, and Low German word , meaning "beautiful" or "good".

Unlike ,  can be used 24 hours a day. It is semantically equivalent to the Low Saxon (Plattdüütsch) greeting  and replaced it in many areas. In Hessen,  is used for hello and good bye, but  is solely used for good bye. The double form  is also used as an all day greeting in for example Flensburg that belonged to Denmark until 1864.

In Finland, a similar greeting  is used for "hello", "hi" in the Finnish language. However,  is used as a good bye, similarly to "bye bye" in English, even with a similar intonation. Both are particularly typical of Southwestern Finnish, but through internal migration spread to the capital and with the help of TV to the rest of the language area. Southwest Finland traded with Hanseatic cities, so it is plausible that the greeting was borrowed from their dialects.

It is theorised that it comes from Tampere due to its large number of foreign workers and like  has been borrowed from morrow and abbreviated.

 is also used in Dutch Low Saxon dialects in the eastern part of the provinces Groningen and Drenthe.

See also
 MoinMoin (wiki software named after the greeting)

References

German words and phrases
Kashubian language
Greeting words and phrases
Culture of Schleswig-Holstein

stq:Moin